Façesh is a village in the former municipality of Shëngjergj in Tirana County, Albania. At the 2015 local government reform it became part of the municipality Tirana.

Demographic history
Façesh (Fevaçish) appears in the Ottoman defter of 1467 as a village belonging to the region of Tamadhea in the vilayet of Çermeniça. The village had a total of four households which were represented by the following household heads: Ilia Dofri, Petër Kalluri, Petër Shirgji, Mathe Gjiraku.

References

Populated places in Tirana
Villages in Tirana County